Feldmarschalleutnant Alfred Johann Theophil Jansa von Tannenau, (16 July 1884 in Stanislawow – 20 December 1963 in Vienna) was an Austrian Army Officer.

Alfred Jansa's father was Emanuel Jansa, a colonel in the Austro-Hungarian Army. His mother was Anna von Meyer. 

During World War I he held different positions on the Serbian, Italian and Russian fronts, including being Austrian liaison officer to the Bulgarian Army (1915–1916).

Jansa married Judith Reviczky von Revisnye on 8 April 1919.

In 1930 he was the Commander of the Niederösterreich Brigade, until he was appointed the Austrian Military attaché in Berlin in 1933. Afterwards, he was made Chief of Staff of the Austrian Army in 1936.

Prior to the Anschluss Jansa and his staff had developed a scenario for Austria's defense against a German attack. Chancellor of Austria Kurt Schuschnigg was under considerable pressure from Germany, including the demand to remove Jansa from his office. The Berchtesgaden agreement (12 February 1938) stipulated in paragraph 8, that Jansa should be replaced with Franz Böhme. Jansa retired from the army on 17 February 1938.

Decorations and awards
 Gallipoli Star ("Iron Crescent", Ottoman Empire)
 Iron Cross (1914), 1st class
 Military Merit Order, 3rd class with war decoration and swords (Bavaria)
 Decoration for Services to the Red Cross
 Bronze Military Merit Medal on the red band
 Bronze and Silver Military Merit Medal (Austria-Hungary)
 Military Merit Cross, 3rd class with War Decoration (Austria-Hungary)
 Order of the Iron Crown, 3rd class with war decoration and swords
 Grand Silver Medal for Services to the Republic of Austria

References

External links
 Alfred Jansa’s Memoires (in German) 

1884 births
1963 deaths
Military personnel from Ivano-Frankivsk
People from the Kingdom of Galicia and Lodomeria
Austrian generals
Austro-Hungarian military personnel of World War I
Recipients of the Iron Cross (1914), 1st class
Recipients of the Grand Decoration for Services to the Republic of Austria